Kathrin Passig (born 4 June 1970) is a German writer.

Life and Works
Passig was born in 1970 in Deggendorf, a small town in Lower Bavaria. She is editor and programmer of the blog "Riesenmaschine" which received the Grimme Online Award 2006, awarded by the renowned Adolf-Grimme-Institut. The same year, her short story “Sie befinden sich hier” (“You are here”) got her the Ingeborg Bachmann Prize. One of her most successful books is "Lexikon des Unwissens – Worauf es bisher keine Antwort gibt" ("Encyclopedia of Ignorance – Everything we don't know so far") published by Rowohlt in 2007.

She also works as a translator, among her translations are works by William Leonard Marshall, Bob Dylan, Jacob Weisberg, and Harlan Coben.

Works
 with Ira Strübel: Die Wahl der Qual (2000, Rowohlt)
 Sie befinden sich hier (2006, transl. You are here by Lucy Powell)
 with Holm Friebe: Das nächste große Ding (2007, Rowohlt)
 with Aleks Scholz: Lexikon des Unwissens (2007, Rowohlt)
 with Ira Strübel: Strübel & Passig. Gesammelte Kolumnen (2007, Verbrecher)
 with Sascha Lobo: Dinge geregelt kriegen – ohne einen Funken Selbstdisziplin (2009, Rowohlt)
 with Aleks Scholz: Verirren. Eine Anleitung für Anfänger und Fortgeschrittene (2010, Rowohlt)
 with Aleks Scholz and Kai Schreiber: Das neue Lexikon des Unwissens. (2011, Rowohlt)
 with Sascha Lobo: Internet – Segen oder Fluch (2012, Rowohlt)
 with Johannes Jander: Weniger schlecht programmieren (2013, O'Reilly)

References

External links

 

1970 births
Living people
People from Deggendorf
Writers from Berlin
German women short story writers
German short story writers
German women writers
Ingeborg Bachmann Prize winners